Elections to the Liverpool School Board were held in November 1897.
These were held every three years, when all fifteen board members were elected.
In 1897 there were twenty candidates for the fifteen board member positions.

Each voter had fifteen votes to cast.

After the election, the composition of the School Board was:

* - Retiring board member seeking re-election

Elected

Not Elected

References

1897
Liverpool
1890s in Liverpool
November 1897 events